German submarine U-68 was a Type IXC U-boat of Nazi Germany's Kriegsmarine during World War II. The submarine was laid down on 20 April 1940 at the DeSchiMAG AG Weser yard at Bremen as yard number 987, launched on 22 October and commissioned on 1 January 1941 under the command of Korvettenkapitän Karl-Friedrich Merten as part of 2nd U-boat Flotilla.

She was a member of one wolfpack.
 
On 10 April 1944, during her tenth patrol, she was sunk northwest of Madeira by US aircraft from the escort carrier .

Design
German Type IXC submarines were slightly larger than the original Type IXBs. U-68 had a displacement of  when at the surface and  while submerged. She had two shafts and two  propellers.

U-68 was fitted with six  torpedo tubes (four fitted at the bow and two at the stern), 22 torpedoes, one  SK C/32 naval gun, 180 rounds, and a  SK C/30 as well as a  C/30 anti-aircraft gun. The boat had a complement of forty-eight.

Service history

First patrol
U-68 left Kiel on 30 June 1941 for the Atlantic Ocean via the gap between Iceland and the Faroe Islands. She docked at her new base at Lorient, on the French Atlantic coast, on 1 August. She would be based there for the rest of her career.

Second patrol
Heading for the south Atlantic, the boat came across Silverbelle southwest of the Canary Islands and sank her on 22 September 1941. On 28 September she was involved in an action in Tarrafal Bay, Cape Verde islands, but escaped unscathed. The following month she sank RFA Darkdale while the ship was at anchor off Jamestown, Saint Helena on 22 October. U-68 also sank Bradford City west of South West Africa (now Namibia) on 1 November. The U-boat collided with the stricken ship while diving underneath her. The submarine's bow was bent.

Nevertheless, the submarine returned to Lorient on 25 December.

Third patrol
U-68s third sortie was also conducted off the west coast of Africa. The boat's crew were kept busy, sinking Baron Newlands on the 16th and Ile de Batz on the 17th; all the vessels met their end in the vicinity of Liberia.

U-68 had turned for home when she sank Muncaster Castle with two torpedoes south southwest of Monrovia. More than ten lifeboats were seen by the Germans; there were 329 survivors.

Fourth patrol
For her fourth patrol U-68 moved to the Caribbean Sea, leaving Lorient on 14 May 1942. On the night of 5 June she sank , which at 13,006 GRT was then the world's largest oil tanker.

On the night of 10 June, northeast of the Panama Canal, she torpedoed the 8,581 GRT British freighter Surrey. 5,000 tons of dynamite in the cargo detonated after the ship sank. The shock wave lifted the U-boat out of the water as if she had been hit herself; both diesel engines and the gyrocompass were disabled.

Another victim was Port Montreal. She was sunk with what Merten noted in the boat's war diary as a lucky [torpedo] hit.

In all, U-68 sank seven ships during this patrol before returning to Lorient on 10 July.

Fifth patrol
The submarine left Lorient on her fifth patrol on 20 August 1942. She would not see her base again until December. At 109 days, this was to be her longest and most successful sally. Heading once more into the South Atlantic, she attacked and sank Trevilley east northeast of Ascension Island on 12 September. The Master and Chief Officer were taken prisoner.

She travelled further south, sinking ships such as Gasterkerk on 8 October and Sarthe on the same date, both in the area of the Cape of Good Hope. She also disposed of Belgian Fighter on the ninth.

Turning for home on 16 October, she sank City of Cairo on 6 November. U-68 returned a month later to Lorient on December 6.

Sixth patrol
The boat's sixth patrol in the first half of 1943 was again to northern South America. Having sunk two ships, she was attacked by a US Mariner flying boat on 2 April; damage was slight.

Seventh and eighth patrols
U-68 was attacked by one of four British De Havilland Mosquitos on the western edge of the Bay of Biscay on 14 June 1943. One man was killed, three were wounded

Patrol number eight was relatively uneventful.

Ninth patrol
The boat returned to her most successful hunting ground - the South Atlantic. In another mammoth patrol (107 days), she sank four more ships.

One of them, the Norwegian tanker Litiopa, had numerous torpedoes and rounds from the deck gun fired at her, but stubbornly refused to succumb. Having been initially encountered at night on 21 October 1943, it was not until the following day that she sank.

The Litiopas sole escort was the mine-sweeping trawler HMS Orfasy. She was sunk relatively easily on 21 October before the attack on the tanker.

The other two ships were New Columbia, (sunk southwest of Bingerville, Ivory Coast) on 31 October and the French Fort de Vaux on 30 November. The latter vessel met her end after 'Aphrodite' radar decoys had been used to lure the escort vessels away.

U-68s inbound route took her close to the northwest Spanish coast. She docked at Lorient on 23 December 1943.

Tenth patrol and loss
The boat left Lorient for the last time on 22 March 1944. On 10 April, she was sunk at position , northwest of the Portuguese island of Madeira, by depth charges and rockets from Grumman Avenger and Grumman Wildcat aircraft from the United States escort carrier .

56 men died; there was one survivor, who was the lookout left top-side when the submarine crash-dived in an attempt to avoid attack.

Wolfpacks
U-68 took part in one wolfpack, namely:
 Eisbär (25 August - 1 September 1942)

Summary of raiding history

References

Notes

Citations

Bibliography

External links

1940 ships
German Type IX submarines
Ships built in Bremen (state)
U-boats commissioned in 1941
U-boats sunk in 1944
World War II shipwrecks in the Atlantic Ocean
World War II submarines of Germany
U-boats sunk by US aircraft
Maritime incidents in April 1944